Myloi may refer to places in Greece:

Myloi, Argolis, a place in the southwestern part of Argolis
Myloi, Euboea, a village in Euboea, part of the municipal unit Karystos
Myloi, Phthiotis, a village in Phthiotis, part of the municipal unit Pelasgia
Myloi, Samos, a village on the island of Samos, part of the municipal unit Pythagoreio
Myloi, Crete, a village on the island of Crete, part of the municipality Rethymno

See also

Ereipia Myloi, ancient ruins in Thesprotia
Lampou Myloi, a place in the island of Lesbos